Bhavani Peth Assembly constituency was one of the 288 assembly constituencies of  Maharashtra a western state of India. Bhavani Peth was also part of Pune Lok Sabha constituency. Bhavani Peth seat existed till  2004 elections until Kothrud Assembly constituency was formed in the delimitation of 2008.

Member of Legislative Assembly

 1967: Tikamdas Daduram Memjade, Indian National Congress
 1972: Tikamdas Daduram Memjade, Indian National Congress
 1978: Bhai Vaidya, Janata Party
 1980: Aminuddin Penwale, Indian National Congress (I)
 1985: Prakash Keshavrao Dhere, Independent
 1990: Prakash Keshavrao Dhere, Indian National Congress
 1995: Deepak Paigude, Shiv Sena
 1999: Deepak Paigude, Shiv Sena
 2004: Kamal Dhole Patil, Nationalist Congress Party
 After 2008 : The seat ceased to exist.

See also

 Bhavani Peth
 Pune City
 Shivajinagar Assembly constituency
 Kothrud Assembly constituency
 List of constituencies of Maharashtra Legislative Assembly

References

Assembly constituencies of Pune district
Former assembly constituencies of Maharashtra